Andreas Illiger (born 1982) is a German self-taught video game developer who studied Communication Design (photography, conception and drafting, language and communication, typography and layout) at the Muthesius Academy of Fine Arts and Design in Kiel. He is the author of the 5.6 million-selling, chart-topping 2011 iOS game Tiny Wings and also of the 2009 Windows audio-visual software Microsia.

Biographical
Andreas Illiger is from Kiel, Germany. He was born in 1982.

References

Interview for German television 1 June 2011 https://web.archive.org/web/20110824125128/http://www.zdf.de/ZDFmediathek/beitrag/video/1346874/Der%2BErfolg%2Bvon%2BTiny%2BWings

1982 births
Living people
Businesspeople from Kiel
German video game designers
Video game programmers